is a railway station of the Chūō Main Line, East Japan Railway Company (JR East) in the city of Uenohara, Yamanashi Prefecture, Japan.

Lines
Shiotsu Station is served by the Chūō Rapid Line / Chūō Main Line , and is 74.0 kilometers from the terminus of the line at Tokyo Station.

Station layout
The station has a single island platform and a single side platform serving three tracks, connected to the station building by a footbridge. The station is staffed.

Platforms

Station history
Shiotsu Station first opened on December 15, 1910, as a station for both freight and passenger service on the Japanese Government Railways (JGR) Chūō Main Line. The JGC became the JNR after the end of World War II. With the dissolution and privatization of the JNR on April 1, 1987, the station came under the control of the East Japan Railway Company. Automated turnstiles using the Suica IC Card system came into operation from November 18, 2001.

Passenger statistics
In fiscal 2017, the station was used by an average of 1641 passengers daily (boarding passengers only).

Surrounding area
Shiotsu Elementary School
Japan National Route 20

See also
 List of railway stations in Japan

References

 Miyoshi Kozo. Chuo-sen Machi to eki Hyaku-niju nen. JT Publishing (2009)

External links

Official home page.

Railway stations in Yamanashi Prefecture
Railway stations in Japan opened in 1910
Chūō Main Line
Stations of East Japan Railway Company
Uenohara, Yamanashi